Arthur Gardner may refer to:
 Arthur Gardner (footballer) (1878–after 1900), English professional footballer
 A. D. Gardner or Arthur Duncan Gardner (1884–1977), professor of medicine at Oxford University
 Arthur Gardner (diplomat) (1889–1967), United States foreign diplomat
 Arthur Gardner (producer) (1910–2014), American actor and film producer
 Art Gardner (born 1952), outfielder in Major League Baseball

See also
Art Gardiner (1899–1954), Major League Baseball pitcher
Arthur Gardiner (1876–1948), Australian politician
Arthur Gardiner Butler (1844–1925), English entomologist and naturalist
Ernest Arthur Gardner (1878–1972), known as Arthur Gardner, architectural historian